Charles Georges Javet (1802 in Winterthur, Kanton Zürich – 25 May 1882 in Passy, Paris) was a Swiss-born French insect dealer and entomologist. He specialised in Coleoptera.

Javet was a very active member of the Société entomologique de France or Entomological Society of France.

Partial list of works
 1858. Description d’une nouvelle espèce de Batocera. Archives Entomologiques, Paris. 1:412-413 (1858).
 Note sur le Julodis onopordi. Annales de la Société Entomologique de France, Bulletin (4) 9:xxvi.

References
Constantin, R. 1992: Memorial des Coléopteristes Français.  Bull. liaison Assoc. Col. reg. parisienne, Paris (Suppl. 14):1-92.

French entomologists
French people of Swiss descent
1802 births
1882 deaths